St. Mary's School may refer to:

Australia
 St Marys Senior High School, St Marys, New South Wales
 St Mary's College, Hobart, Tasmania
 St Mary's Primary School, West Melbourne, Victoria
 St Mary's Anglican Girls' School, Perth, Western Australia

Canada
 St. Mary's High School (Calgary), Alberta
 St. Mary's Academy (New Brunswick)
 St. Mary's Catholic Secondary School, Cobourg, Ontario
 St. Mary Catholic Secondary School (Hamilton, Ontario)
 St. Mary's High School (Kitchener), Ontario
 St. Mary Catholic Secondary School (Pickering, Ontario)
 St. Mary's Catholic Secondary School (Toronto), Ontario
 St. Mary's Catholic High School (Woodstock, Ontario)

Costa Rica
 Saint Mary High School (Guachipelin)

Ghana
 St Mary's Senior High School (Ghana), Korle Gonno

India
 St. Mary's English High School, Guwahati, Assam
 St. Mary's High School, Jorhat, Assam
 St. Mary's High School, North Lakhimpur, Assam
 St. Mary's Anglo-Indian Higher Secondary School, Chennai
 St. Mary's Convent High School, Goa, Mapusa, Goa
 St. Mary's High School (Rajkot), Gujarat
 St. Mary's Convent School, Kasauli, Himachal Pradesh
 St. Mary's Convent Girls High School, Ollur, Thrissur, Kerala
 St. Mary's Higher Secondary School, Thiruvananthapuram, Kerala
 St. Mary's Convent School, Dewas, Madhya Pradesh
 St. Mary's Convent School, Ujjain, Madhya Pradesh
 St. Mary's School, Mumbai, Maharashtra
 St. Mary's High School SSC, Mumbai, Maharashtra
 St. Mary's Convent High School, Mulund, Mumbai, Maharashtra
 St. Mary's School, Pune, Maharashtra
 St. Mary's Higher Secondary School, Jharsuguda, Odisha
 St. Mary's School, Patiala, Punjab
 St. Mary's High School, Mt. Abu, Rajasthan
 St. Mary's Higher Secondary School, Dindigul, Tamil Nadu
 St. Mary's High School, Secunderabad, Telangana
 St. Mary's Convent High School, Nainital, Uttarakhand

Jamaica
 St Mary High School, Jamaica, Saint Mary Parish, Jamaica

Japan
 St. Mary's International School, Tokyo

Kenya
 St. Mary's School, Nairobi
 St. Mary's School, Yala

Malaysia
 St. Mary's School, Kuala Lumpur
 SMK St Mary Papar

New Zealand
 St Mary's Catholic School, Gisborne District
 St Mary's Catholic School, Otorohanga District

Pakistan
 St. Mary's High School, Quetta, Balochistan
 St. Mary's High School, Peshawar, Khyber Pakhtunkhwa
 St Mary's Convent High School, Hyderabad, Sindh

South Africa
 St Mary's School, Waverley, Gauteng
 St. Mary's Diocesan School for Girls, Pretoria, Gauteng
 St. Mary's Diocesan School for Girls, Kloof, KwaZulu-Natal

Tristan da Cunha
 St. Mary's School, Edinburgh of the Seven Seas

United Arab Emirates
 St. Mary's Catholic High School, Dubai, UAE
 St. Mary's Catholic High School, Fujairah

United Kingdom

England
 St Mary's School Ascot, South Ascot, Berkshire
 St Mary's School, Gerrards Cross, Buckinghamshire
 St Mary's School, Cambridge, Cambridgeshire
 St Mary's School, Eccleston, Cheshire
 St Mary's Catholic High School, Chesterfield, Derbyshire
 St Mary's School, Shaftesbury, Dorset
 St Mary's School, Colchester, Essex
 St Mary's Primary School, Yate, Gloucestershire
 St Mary's Catholic High School, Astley, Greater Manchester
 St Mary's Catholic School, Bishop's Stortford, Hertfordshire
 St Mary's Church of England High School, Cheshunt, Hertfordshire
 St Mary's Roman Catholic High School, Lugwardine, Herefordshire
 St. Mary's Catholic High School, Menston, Leeds
 St Mary's Catholic High School, Grimsby, Lincolnshire
 St. Mary's Roman Catholic Primary School, Clapham, London
 St Mary's Roman Catholic High School, Croydon, London
 St Mary's College, Crosby, Merseyside
 St Mary's Convent School, Scarborough, North Yorkshire
 St Mary's School, Banbury, Oxfordshire
 St Mary's School, Wantage, Oxfordshire
 St Mary's Catholic Primary School, Portslade, Sussex
 St. Mary's Catholic School, Newcastle, Tyne and Wear
 St Mary's C of E Primary School, South Shields, Tyne and Wear
 St Mary's School, Calne, Wiltshire

Northern Ireland
 St Mary's Christian Brothers' Grammar School, Belfast, County Antrim
 St Mary's Primary School, Ballyward, County Down
 St Mary's High School, Newry, Newry, County Down
 St Mary's High School, Limavady, County Londonderry
 St Mary's Grammar School, Magherafelt, County Londonderry
 St Mary's Primary School, Fivemiletown, County Tyrone

Scotland
 St. Mary's School, Melrose

United States
(by state then city)

A–M
 St. Mary's High School (Phoenix, Arizona)

 St. Mary's College High School, Berkeley, California
 St. Mary's High School (Stockton, California)
 St. Mary's High School (Colorado Springs), Colorado
 St. Mary's School (Wilmington, Delaware)

 School of St. Mary (Lake Forest, Illinois)
 St. Mary's School (Guttenberg, Iowa)
 St. Mary's High School (Remsen, Iowa)
 St. Mary's High School (Storm Lake, Iowa)

 St. Mary High School (Paducah, Kentucky)

 St. Mary's High School (Natchitoches, Louisiana)

 St. Mary's High School (Annapolis, Maryland)
 St. Mary's Ryken High School, Leonardtown, Maryland
 St. Peter's Roman Catholic Church-St. Mary's School, Southbridge, Massachusetts
 Saint Mary High School (Westfield, Massachusetts)
 St. Mary's High School (Lynn, Massachusetts)
 Saint Mary's School (Chelsea, Michigan)
 St. Mary High School (Lake Leelanau, Michigan)
 St. Mary High School (Royal Oak, Michigan)
 Shattuck-Saint Mary's, Faribault, Minnesota
 St. Mary's High School (Sleepy Eye, Minnesota)
 St. Mary's High School (Independence, Missouri)
 St. Mary's High School (St. Louis), Missouri

N–Z

 St. Mary's High School (O'Neill, Nebraska)
 Saint Mary School, Bordentown, New Jersey
 St. Mary's Hall-Doane Academy, Burlington, New Jersey
 St. Mary High School (Jersey City, New Jersey)
 St. Mary High School (Rutherford, New Jersey)
 St. Mary High School, renamed in 2000 as Cardinal McCarrick High School, South Amboy, New Jersey
 St. Mary's High School (Lancaster, New York)
 St. Mary's High School (Manhasset, New York)
 Saint Mary's School (Raleigh, North Carolina)
 St. Mary Catholic School (Wilmington, North Carolina)
 St. Mary's High School (Devils Lake, North Dakota)

 St. Mary's Catholic School, Mansfield, Ohio
 Old St. Mary's School, Marietta, Ohio, listed on the NRHP in Washington County, Ohio
 St. Mary's School (Sandusky, Ohio), listed on the NRHP in Erie County, Ohio
 St. Mary Catholic Central High School, Sandusky, Ohio
 St. Mary's School (Medford, Oregon)

 St. Mary High School (Dell Rapids, South Dakota)
 St. Mary's School (Elkton, South Dakota), listed on the NRHP in Brookings County, South Dakota

 St. Mary's Episcopal School (Memphis, Tennessee), private school for girls
 St. Mary's Catholic School (Brownsville, Texas)
 St. Mary's Catholic School (Longview, Texas)
 St. Mary's Hall (San Antonio, Texas), a private school
 St. Mary's Catholic School (Temple, Texas)
 St. Mary's Catholic School (Richmond, Virginia)
 St. Mary Catholic High School (Neenah, Wisconsin)

See also
 
 St. Mary's Academy (disambiguation)
 Saint Mary's College (disambiguation)
 Saint Mary's University (disambiguation)
 Scoil Mhuire (disambiguation)